The 123rd Brigade was a formation of  the British Army during the First World War. It was raised as part of the new army also known as Kitchener's Army and assigned to the 41st Division.

Formation
The infantry battalions did not all serve at once, but all were assigned to the brigade during the war.
11th Battalion, Queen's Royal Regiment (West Surrey) 	 
10th Battalion, Royal West Kent Regiment (Kent County)
23rd Battalion, Middlesex Regiment (2nd Football)
20th Battalion, Durham Light Infantry (Wearside) 
123rd Machine Gun Company 
123rd Trench Mortar Battery

References

Infantry brigades of the British Army in World War I